Kosmos 638 was an uncrewed test of the 1975 Apollo–Soyuz Test Project Soyuz. It carried an APAS-75 androgynous docking system.

This was followed by another uncrewed test of this spacecraft type, Kosmos 672. It was a Soyuz 7K-TM spacecraft.

When the air was released from the orbital module (which is ejected before re-entry of the capsule) it caused unexpected motions with the spacecraft. This led to the next test also being uncrewed.

Mission parameters
Spacecraft: Soyuz-7K-TM №71
Mass: 6510 to 6680 kg
Crew: None
Launched: April 3, 1974
Landed: April 13, 1974

References
Mir Hardware Heritage
Mir Hardware Heritage (NASA report RP 1357) (PDF format)
Mir Hardware Heritage (NASA report RP 1357) (Wikisource)

Kosmos 0638
1974 in the Soviet Union
Spacecraft launched in 1974
Apollo–Soyuz Test Project
Soyuz uncrewed test flights